Nordostniederdeutsch is a Low German dialect group used predominantly in the Mecklenburg area of today’s North German state of Mecklenburg-Western Pomerania.

There is no sharp dividing line between its western dialects and adjacent Northern Low Saxon dialects on the one hand and between its eastern dialects including those of Western Pomerania on the other hand. Its Western Slavic substrata do not seem to be as strong as those of dialects spoken farther east. A striking eastern characteristic is the use of the diminutive suffix -ing (e.g. Poot ‘paw’ > Pöting ‘little paw’, Änning ‘Annie’, lies’ ‘quietly’, ‘softly’, ‘slowly’ > liesing ‘very quietly’, ‘very softly’, ‘very carefully’, ‘nice and easy’). This suffix first appears in modern Low German variations (early 19th century onwards), and is of Germanic origin1, being attested in several other Germanic-speaking areas, such as Westphalian family names Arning, Smeding and Janning.

External links 
1: , Mirjam Schmuck, https://www.germanistik.uni-mainz.de/files/2015/01/Schmuck-2009.pdf.

Low German
German dialects
Languages of Germany
Mecklenburg